Hemoptysis is the coughing up of blood or blood-stained mucus from the bronchi, larynx, trachea, or lungs. In other words, it is the airway bleeding. This can occur with lung cancer, infections such as tuberculosis, bronchitis, or pneumonia, and certain cardiovascular conditions. In such cases, there are always severe injuries. The primary danger comes from choking, rather than blood loss.

Diagnosis

 Past history, history of present illness, family history
 history of tuberculosis, bronchiectasis, chronic bronchitis, mitral stenosis, etc.
 history of cigarette smoking, occupational diseases by exposure to silica dust, etc.
 Blood
 duration, frequency, amount
 Amounts of blood: large amounts of blood, or is there blood-streaked sputum
 Probable source of bleeding: Is the blood coughed up, or vomited?
 Bloody sputum
 color, characters: blood-streaked, fresh blood, frothy pink, bloody gelatinous.
 Accompanying symptoms
 fever, chest pain, coughing, purulent sputum, mucocutaneous bleeding, jaundice.
 Imaging examination
 chest X-ray, CT scan and 3D reconstruction images or CT virtual bronchoscopy, bronchial angiography.
 Laboratory tests
 blood test: WBC
 Sputum: cells and bacterial examinations, sputum culture
 Bronchial fiber endoscopy

Differential diagnosis

The most common causes for hemoptysis in adults are chest infections such as bronchitis or pneumonia.  In children, hemoptysis is commonly caused by the presence of a foreign body in the airway. Other common causes include lung cancers and tuberculosis. Less common causes include aspergilloma, bronchiectasis, coccidioidomycosis, pulmonary embolism, pneumonic plague, and cystic fibrosis. Rarer causes include hereditary hemorrhagic telangiectasia (HHT or Rendu-Osler-Weber syndrome), Goodpasture's syndrome, and granulomatosis with polyangiitis. A rare cause of hemoptysis in women is endometriosis, which leads to intermittent hemoptysis coinciding with menstrual periods in 7% of women with thoracic endometriosis syndrome. Hemoptysis may be exacerbated or even caused by overtreatment with anticoagulant drugs such as warfarin.

Blood-laced mucus from the sinus or nose area can sometimes be misidentified as symptomatic of hemoptysis (such secretions can be a sign of nasal or sinus cancer, but also a sinus infection). Extensive non-respiratory injury can also cause one to cough up blood.  Cardiac causes like congestive heart failure and mitral stenosis should be ruled out.The origin of blood can be identified by observing its color. Bright-red, foamy blood comes from the respiratory tract, whereas dark-red, coffee-colored blood comes from the gastrointestinal tract. Sometimes hemoptysis may be rust-colored.
 Lung cancer, including both non-small cell lung carcinoma and small cell lung carcinoma.
 Sarcoidosis
 Aspergilloma
 Tuberculosis
 Histoplasmosis
 Pneumonia
 Pulmonary edema
 Endometriosis and thoracic endometriosis syndrome
 Foreign body aspiration and aspiration pneumonia
 Goodpasture's syndrome
 Microscopic polyangiitis
 Granulomatosis with polyangiitis
 Eosinophilic granulomatosis with polyangiitis
 Bronchitis
 Bronchiectasis
 Pulmonary embolism
 Anticoagulant use
 Trauma
 Lung abscess
 Mitral stenosis
 Tropical pulmonary eosinophilia
 Bleeding disorders
 Hughes-Stovin syndrome and other variants of Behçet's disease
 Pulmonary arteriovenous malformations

Massive hemoptysis and mortality 
 
Although there are reports that the fatality rate is as high as 80%, the in-hospital mortality rate for hospitalized hemoptysis patients is 2669/28539=9.4%, calculated from the data in the article by Kinoshita et al. This is probably the most reasonable figure considering the overwhelming number of cases.

The general definition of massive hemoptysis is more than 200 ml within 24 hours, but there is a wide range in the literature (100-600 ml). Considering that the total volume of the tracheal and bronchial lumen is about 150 cc, it may be reasonable to define massive hemoptysis as 200 ml, which is a little more than 150 ml, in terms of setting the threshold for fatal hemoptysis. More than 400ml/day is not adequate for screening purposes.

Treatment
Treatment depends on the underlying cause. Treatments include iced saline, and topical vasoconstrictors such as adrenalin or vasopressin. Tranexamic acid was proved to improve in-hospital mortality. Selective bronchial intubation can be used to collapse the lung that is bleeding. Also, endobronchial tamponade can be used. Laser photocoagulation can be used to stop bleeding during bronchoscopy. Angiography of bronchial arteries can be performed to locate the bleeding, and it can often be embolized. Bronchial artery embolization (BAE) is the first line treatment nowadays. Surgical option is usually the last resort and can involve removal of a lung lobe or removal of the entire lung. Cough suppressants can increase the risk of choking.

References

Further reading

External links 

Bleeding
Respiratory diseases
Symptoms and signs: Respiratory system